Strijp is a former town in the Dutch province of North Brabant, now a borough of Eindhoven.

Strijp was a separate municipality until 1920, when it became part of Eindhoven. The Philips Stadion, home of football team PSV Eindhoven is based in Strijp. The stadium has a capacity of around 35,000. 
Strijp-S, the repurposed buildings of the former Philips factory complex, is located within Strijp.

References

Born in Strijp 
Coen Dillen, PSV Eindhoven footballer and brother of wealthy Philips businessman Cor Dillen.

Former municipalities of North Brabant
Populated places in North Brabant
Boroughs of Eindhoven